Austėja is a feminine Lithuanian given name derived from the name of an ancient Lithuanian bee goddess. The name was really popular in 2005.

References

Feminine given names
Lithuanian feminine given names
Bees in popular culture